The Further Adventures of El Chico is an album by American jazz drummer Chico Hamilton featuring performances recorded in 1966 for the Impulse! label.

Reception
The Allmusic review by Ron Wynn awarded the album 2½ stars: "Sometimes super and sometimes ragged cuts".

Track listing
All compositions by Chico Hamilton except as noted
 "Got My Mojo Working" (Preston Foster) - 3:05
 "Who Can I Turn To (When Nobody Needs Me)?" (Leslie Bricusse, Anthony Newley) - 3:35
 "That Boy With The Long Hair" - 4:10
 "Daydream" (John Sebastian) - 2:10
 "The Shadow Of Your Smile" (Johnny Mandel, Paul Francis Webster) - 2:53
 "Evil Eye" (Gábor Szabó) - 3:15
 "Monday, Monday" (John Phillips) - 2:23
 "Manila" - 4:45
 "My Romance" (Lorenz Hart, Richard Rodgers) - 2:50
 "Stella by Starlight" (Ned Washington, Victor Young) - 4:50
Recorded at Rudy Van Gelder Studio in Englewood Cliffs, New Jersey on May 2, 1966 (tracks 2, 5, 6 & 8-10) and May 5, 1966 (tracks 1, 3, 4 & 7)

Personnel
Chico Hamilton – drums
Clark Terry - trumpet (tracks 1 & 4)
Jimmy Cheatham - trombone (tracks 1, 3, 4 & 7)
Danny Bank - piccolo (tracks 1, 3, 4 & 7)
Jerome Richardson - flute, alto saxophone (tracks 1, 3, 4 & 6-10)
Charlie Mariano - alto saxophone (tracks 1, 3, 4 & 6-10)
Gábor Szabó – guitar
Ron Carter (tracks 2, 5, 6 & 8-10), Richard Davis (tracks 1, 3, 4 & 7) – bass
Willie Bobo, Victor Pantoja  - percussion

References 

Impulse! Records albums
Chico Hamilton albums
Gábor Szabó albums
1966 albums
Albums recorded at Van Gelder Studio
Albums produced by Bob Thiele